Simon Greul and Christopher Kas were the defending champions, but both chose to compete in Barcelona instead.
Mario Ančić and Ivan Dodig won in the final 4–6, 7–6(8), [10–4], against Juan Pablo Brzezicki and Rubén Ramírez Hidalgo.

Seeds

Draw

Draw

References
 Main Draw

Roma Open - Doubles
2010 Doubles